Amalin Yabur Elías (born 7 September 1951) is a Mexican politician from the Institutional Revolutionary Party. From 2003 to 2006 she served as Deputy of the LIX Legislature of the Mexican Congress representing Tabasco.

References

1951 births
Living people
People from Villahermosa
Women members of the Chamber of Deputies (Mexico)
Members of the Chamber of Deputies (Mexico)
Institutional Revolutionary Party politicians
21st-century Mexican women politicians
Politicians from Tabasco
Members of the Congress of Tabasco